The Central Bank of Oman (CBO) was established in December 1974 and began operations on 1 April 1975. It replaced the Oman Currency Board as the principal currency authority in Oman. Currently it is headed by Taimur bin Asaad bin Tariq al-Saeed.

The Central Bank of Oman is responsible for maintaining the stability of the national currency the Omani Rial and ensuring monetary and financial stability in a deregulated and open financial system. The capital base of the CBO which was one million Omani Rials at the commencement of operations in 1975, was strengthened over time and since April 2002 has remained at R0300 million. At the end of 2005, CBO's assets/liabilities totalled RO 1826.4 million.

The Omani banking system has experienced several mergers since the 1990s and as a result the number of commercial banks at the end of 2005 stood at 13, of which five are locally incorporated and eight are branches of foreign banks, together having a branch network of 329 branches. Local banks, in addition, have 10 branches and one representative office abroad. As at the end of 2005, there were also three specialised banks in operation, with a network of 26 branches. The CBO has approved the establishment of an additional local bank (Sohar Bank) and a branch of a foreign bank (Bank of Beirut) that are expected to commence operations by the end of 2006. To strengthen the financial position of licensed banks and enable them to face competition as well as finance large projects, the minimum capital requirement for commercial banks was enhanced to RO50 million for local banks and RO10 million for foreign banks. The overall capital adequacy ratio of the commercial banks improved to reach 18.5 percent in 2005.

The Sultanate has made significant progress in implementing the new capital Adequacy criteria laid down in the Basel-II Accord. The adoption of Basel II would transform the current approaches and tools of supervision of the CBO as well as the audit and risk management practices of banks.

The CBO also administers and participates in the financing of a Bank deposit insurance system, which provides the commercial banks with a high level of security for deposits, while cushioning the effects of any unforeseen circumstances. The CBO also has an early warning system for commercial banks that enables it to
predict possible financial crises and take preventive action when necessary.

The various monetary policy instruments under the CBO's command could be broadly categorized into indirect measures and direct measures. Indirect policy (market oriented) measures include open market operations involving the buying and selling of securities, issuance of Central Bank's own securities, swaps etc. CD auctions are the main open market type operations conducted by CBO to absorb Omani Rial liquidity and banks can repossess these CDs to acquire liquidity both in the inter-bank market as well as the CBO. Direct monetary policy instruments used by the CBO are mainly in the form of reserve requirements and lending ratios .

The CBO has put in place an efficient and advanced payment and settlement system in Oman. The launch of the Real Time Gross Settlement System (RTGS) was the first milestone and went into live operations on 28 September 2005.

History
Until 1970, when Sultan Qaboos bin Said took over, there was no national authority responsible for the supervision of the incipient banking system. The number of banks was small and the banking activities were limited in scales.
The two monetary authorities that preceded the establishment of the Central Bank of Oman, namely the Muscat Currency Authority in 1970 and the Oman Currency Board in 1972, were not vested with full banking status, but, they had well prepared the ground for the emergence of the Central Bank of Oman.
However the major event heralding the eminent creation of the Central Bank of Oman was the launching of the Banking Law in 1974 (which was amended vide Royal Decree No. 114/2000).

Chairmen of the board
Mahmood Muhammad Murad, of Oman Currency Board, 1972–1974
Tariq bin Taimur, of Central Bank of Oman, 1974–1976
Sultans of Oman, 1976–2020
Taimur bin Asaad bin Tariq al-Saeed, 2020–present

Executive presidents
Yusuf A. Nimatallah, 1975 – Dec 1978
Abdul Wahab Khayata, Dec 1978 – June 1991
Hamood Sangour Al Zadjali, June 1991 – Sept 2017
Tahir Salim Al Amri, Sept 2017 –

See also

Economy of Oman
List of banks in Oman

References

Banks established in 1974
1974 establishments in Oman
 
Oman
Government of Oman
Economy of Oman